Aslauga atrophifurca, the Zimbabwe purple, is a butterfly in the family Lycaenidae. It is found in Zimbabwe. The habitat consists of savanna.

Adults are on wing from August to April.

References

Butterflies described in 1981
Aslauga
Endemic fauna of Zimbabwe
Butterflies of Africa